National Centrist Party is a parliamentary political party in Libya, launched by former interim oil minister, Ali Tarhouni, on 23 October 2011. It is a centrist political movement, with bases on democracy and religious moderation.

Ideology

The NCP's self-reported doctrine is moderate. Ali Tarhouni, the founder and leader of the NCP, declared in an interview taken by a journalist of Libya Herald: "Moderation is the name of our movement. We are moderate. We are in the middle. I think any radicalization of Islam is something that we oppose. We strongly oppose that. We grew up in this country and we basically don’t practice these things that they do and I hope that they stop because Libya does not really condone that."

Election results
NCP competed in the Libyan General National Congress election, 2012. The party received 2 of the 80 party-list seats, and with others political parties is in minority.

See also
Justice and Construction Party (Libya)
National Forces Alliance

References

2011 establishments in Libya
Islamic political parties in Libya
Liberal parties in Libya
Libyan nationalism
Political parties established in 2011
Political parties in Libya